Minskoff may refer to:

 Minskoff Theatre, Broadway theatre in New York City
 Dorothea Grater Minskoff (1910–1986), American lawyer 
Henry H. Minskoff (1911–1984), American real estate developer